John Wright (23 September 1861 – 23 December 1912) was an English first-class cricketer.

Wright was born at Nantwich. Described as "A fast round-armed bowler, rather uncertain; a good bat, and fields well near the wicket", Wright made a single appearance in first-class cricket for the North of England in the North v South match at Lord's in 1885, played in benefit of the family of Fred Morley. Batting twice during the match, Wright was dismissed for 3 runs by W. G. Grace, while in their second-innings he was dismissed without scoring by Arnold Fothergill. He later played minor counties cricket for Cheshire in 1895, making one appearance against Worcestershire.

He was employed in various jobs during his life at Manchester, Stockport, Weston-super-Mare, Nelson, and Sale. He died at Willaston in December 1912.

References

External links

1861 births
1912 deaths
People from Nantwich
English cricketers
North v South cricketers
Cheshire cricketers